Events from the year 1553 in France

Incumbents
 Monarch – Henry II

Events
Invasion of Corsica

Births
 
13 December – Henry IV of France (died 1610).
14 May – Margaret of Valois, Queen of France (died 1615)

Full date missing
Louise of Lorraine, queen consort (died 1601)
Pierre de Lancre, judge, conducted a massive witch-hunt (died 1631)
Jacques Auguste de Thou, historian (died 1617)

Deaths

Full date missing
Louise Borgia, Duchess of Valentinois, noblewoman (born 1500)
François Rabelais, writer and humanist (born between 1483 and 1494)
Gilles Le Breton, architect

See also

References

1550s in France